This page summarises the Main Path matches of the 2022–23 UEFA Europa Conference League qualifying phase and play-off round.

Times are CEST (UTC+2), as listed by UEFA (local times, if different, are in parentheses).

First qualifying round

Summary

|}

Matches

Ħamrun Spartans won 4–2 on aggregate.

Lechia Gdańsk won 6–2 on aggregate.

Drita won 3–1 on aggregate.

4–4 on aggregate. Paide Linnameeskond won 6–5 on penalties.

Milsami Orhei won 2–0 on aggregate.

Laçi won 1–0 on aggregate.

Liepāja won 3–2 on aggregate.

Mura won 4–2 on aggregate.

KuPS won 2–0 on aggregate.

Ružomberok won 2–0 on aggregate.

Budućnost Podgorica won 4–2 on aggregate.

Gżira United won 2–1 on aggregate.

3–3 on aggregate. B36 Tórshavn won 4–3 on penalties.

Olimpija Ljubljana won 3–2 on aggregate.

St Joseph's won 1–0 on aggregate.

Breiðablik won 5–1 on aggregate.

DAC Dunajská Streda won 5–1 on aggregate.

Víkingur won 3–1 on aggregate.

2–2 on aggregate. Sligo Rovers won 4–3 on penalties.

Tre Fiori won 4–1 on aggregate.

Dinamo Minsk won 3–2 on aggregate.

Tuzla City won 8–0 on aggregate.

1–1 on aggregate. Saburtalo Tbilisi won 5–4 on penalties.

Shkëndija won 4–2 on aggregate.

Petrocub Hîncești won 1–0 on aggregate.

Pogoń Szczecin won 4–2 on aggregate.

2–2 on aggregate. Newtown won 4–2 on penalties.

Crusaders won 4–3 on aggregate.

SJK won 4–3 on aggregate.

Riga won 4–0 on aggregate.

Second qualifying round

Summary

|+Main Path

|}

Matches

5–5 on aggregate. Gżira United won 3–1 on penalties.

Aris won 7–2 on aggregate.

APOEL won 2–0 on aggregate.

Fehérvár won 5–3 on aggregate.

İstanbul Başakşehir won 2–1 on aggregate.

Neftçi Baku won 3–2 on aggregate.

Ħamrun Spartans won 2–0 on aggregate.

FCSB won 4–3 on aggregate.

CSKA Sofia won 4–0 on aggregate.

Hapoel Be'er Sheva won 3–1 on aggregate.

Maccabi Tel Aviv won 3–0 on aggregate.

Universitatea Craiova won 4–1 on aggregate.

0–0 on aggregate. Paide Linnameeskond won 5–3 on penalties.

Kisvárda won 2–0 on aggregate.

Konyaspor won 5–0 on aggregate.

3–3 on aggregate. Sepsi Sfântu Gheorghe won 4–2 on penalties.

Kyzylzhar won 3–2 on aggregate.

Young Boys won 4–0 on aggregate.

Rapid Wien won 2–1 on aggregate.

Lillestrøm won 6–2 on aggregate.

Breiðablik won 3–2 on aggregate.

1–1 on aggregate. St Patrick's Athletic won 6–5 on penalties.

Slavia Prague won 11–0 on aggregate.

Spartak Trnava won 6–2 on aggregate.

Viborg won 2–0 on aggregate.

DAC Dunajská Streda won 4–0 on aggregate.

Brøndby won 5–1 on aggregate.

AZ won 5–0 on aggregate.

Sligo Rovers won 3–0 on aggregate.

Molde won 6–2 on aggregate. 

Vaduz won 2–1 on aggregate.

B36 Tórshavn won 1–0 on aggregate.

Riga won 5–1 on aggregate.

Basel won 3–1 on aggregate.

Antwerp won 2–0 on aggregate.

Petrocub Hîncești won 4–1 on aggregate.

Čukarički won 8–1 on aggregate.

Levski Sofia won 3–1 on aggregate.

Vitória de Guimarães won 3–0 on aggregate.

Djurgårdens IF won 4–1 on aggregate.

AIK won 4–3 on aggregate.

Shkëndija won 5–2 on aggregate.

Raków Częstochowa won 6–0 on aggregate.

KuPS won 6–3 on aggregate.

Viking won 2–1 on aggregate.

Third qualifying round

Summary

|+Main Path

|}

Matches

Raków Częstochowa won 3–0 on aggregate.

2–2 on aggregate. AIK won 3–2 on penalties.

Viking won 5–2 on aggregate.

İstanbul Başakşehir won 6–1 on aggregate.

Young Boys won 5–0 on aggregate.

Anderlecht won 5–0 on aggregate.

Viborg won 5–1 on aggregate.

Hajduk Split won 3–2 on aggregate.

2–2 on aggregate. Basel won 3–1 on penalties.

Antwerp won 5–1 on aggregate.

CSKA Sofia won 2–1 on aggregate.

AZ won 7–1 on aggregate.

APOEL won 1–0 on aggregate.

FCSB won 2–0 on aggregate.

Gil Vicente won 5–1 on aggregate.

Wolfsberger AC won 4–0 on aggregate.

Maccabi Tel Aviv won 3–2 on aggregate.

Molde won 4–2 on aggregate.

Rapid Wien won 3–2 on aggregate.

Hapoel Be'er Sheva won 5–1 on aggregate.

2–2 on aggregate. Ħamrun Spartans won 4–1 on penalties.

Twente won 7–2 on aggregate.

Universitatea Craiova won 3–1 on aggregate.

Vaduz won 5–3 on aggregate.

Djurgårdens IF won 6–2 on aggregate.

Fehérvár won 7–1 on aggregate.

Slavia Prague won 3–1 on aggregate.

Play-off round

Summary

|+Main Path

|}

Matches

Basel won 2–1 on aggregate.

Vaduz won 2–1 on aggregate.

Slavia Prague won 3–2 on aggregate.

Djurgårdens IF won 5–3 on aggregate.

Nice won 2–1 on aggregate.

2–2 on aggregate. Hapoel Be'er Sheva won 4–3 on penalties.

İstanbul Başakşehir won 4–2 on aggregate.

FCSB won 4–3 on aggregate.

Partizan won 7–4 on aggregate.

Fiorentina won 2–1 on aggregate.

Villarreal won 6–2 on aggregate.

1. FC Köln won 4–2 on aggregate.

West Ham United won 6–1 on aggregate.

1–1 on aggregate. Anderlecht won 3–1 on penalties.

Slovácko won 4–0 on aggregate.

Molde won 4–1 on aggregate.

AZ won 6–1 on aggregate.

Notes

References

External links

1M